Eudoraea chungangensis is a Gram-negative, strictly aerobic, non-spore-forming and non-motile bacterium from the genus of Eudoraea which has been isolated from  waste water sludge from an aquafarm.

References 

Flavobacteria
Bacteria described in 2015